Hypleurochilus springeri, the orange-spotted blenny, is a species of combtooth blenny found in coral reefs in the Caribbean Sea. This species grows to a length of  TL. The specific name honours the American ichthyologist Victor G. Springer.

References

springeri
Fish of the Caribbean
Fish described in 1966